Christobel Rosemary Mattingley  (1931 – 1 June 2019) was an award-winning Australian author of books for children and adults. Her book Rummage won the Children's Book of the Year Award: Younger Readers and Children's Book of the Year Award: Picture Book in 1982. In the 1996 Queen's Birthday Honours Mattingley was made a Member of the Order of Australia for "service to literature, particularly children's literature, and for community service through her commitment to social and cultural issues".

Her last book was Maralinga's long shadow: Yvonne's story, which was published in 2016 and won the 2017 the Young People's History Prize at the NSW Premier's History Awards.

Bibliography

Children's books

Young adult books

Mattingley, Christobel (1996). Escape from Sarajevo.

Adult non-fiction
 *

Essays and reporting

Books

References 

1931 births
2019 deaths
Australian women writers
Writers from South Australia
Members of the Order of Australia